A by-election for the seat of Canterbury in the New South Wales Legislative Assembly was held in September 1868 because of the resignation of James Pemell.

Dates

Results

James Pemell resigned.

See also
Electoral results for the district of Canterbury
List of New South Wales state by-elections

References

1868 elections in Australia
New South Wales state by-elections
1860s in New South Wales